James Michael Justin (born 23 February 1998) is an English professional footballer who plays as a defender for  club Leicester City and the England national team.

Club career

Luton Town
Born in Luton, Bedfordshire, Justin joined Luton Town in 2005 and progressed through the club's youth system. He was part of the under-11 team that beat Bayern Munich 3–2 to win the Aarau Masters in 2009. Justin was called up to the under-18 team as an under-16 due to injuries to other players, playing at right-back despite being a central midfielder. Following his breakthrough into the under-18 team, Justin also played regularly for the club's development squad that ended 2014–15 as champions of The Central League Southern Division. Justin signed his first professional contract on 4 November 2015 which contracted him to the club until the end of 2016–17. He was named in the matchday squad for the first time on 19 December, remaining an unused substitute in Luton's 3–2 win away to Exeter City. Justin was a member of the under-18 team that won the Youth Alliance South East title and the Youth Alliance Cup in 2015–16, and also reached the quarter-finals of the FA Youth Cup, in which they lost 1–0 to Blackburn Rovers. He made his professional debut as an 83rd-minute substitute for Stephen O'Donnell in a 4–1 win at home to Exeter City on the final day of 2015–16.

Justin broke into the first team in 2016–17, making his full debut at left-back in a 3–1 win at home to newly relegated Championship club Aston Villa in the EFL Cup first round on 10 August 2016. He suffered a calf injury in the warm up before Luton's 2–1 win away to Leyton Orient on 15 October, and returned to the team for a 3–1 victory away to Exeter City in the FA Cup first round on 5 November. After making 14 appearances in all competitions during the first half of the season playing in a number of different positions including at right-back and as a left winger, Justin signed a new two-and-a-half-year contract to keep him at Luton until the summer of 2019, with the option of a further year. He was named Luton Town Young Player of the Season, selected by the Luton Town management team. Justin scored his first professional goal in a 4–1 victory away to Accrington Stanley on 29 April 2017, but was stretchered off after he suffered an ankle ligament sprain in the following match, a 3–1 win at home to Morecambe. However, he recovered in time to play against Blackpool in the play-off semi-final, and started in both legs of the 6–5 aggregate defeat. Justin finished the season with 39 appearances and one goal. On 12 July 2017, Luton rejected a bid of £1 million for Justin from Championship club Nottingham Forest. Later that month, Justin signed a contract extension with Luton until 2020, with the option of a further year.

His contract was extended by a further year at the end of the 2017–18 season after a promotion clause was triggered as a result of Luton's promotion to League One.

Leicester City
Justin signed for Premier League club Leicester City on 28 June 2019 on a five-year contract for an undisclosed fee. He scored on his debut in a 4–0 away victory over his former club Luton in the EFL Cup third round on 24 September.

International career
On 1 June 2017, Justin was called up to the England under-19 team for a training camp in Spain ahead of the 2017 UEFA European Under-19 Championship. He was retained by manager Keith Downing for two further training camps, but did not make the final 18-man squad. Justin received his first call-up to the England under-20 team on 24 August 2017 for two friendly matches against the Netherlands and Switzerland. He made his debut a week later in a 3–0 victory over the Netherlands, coming on as a substitute in the 74th minute. Justin made his full debut after starting against Switzerland four days later, before being substituted on 62 minutes, the match finishing a 0–0 draw.

Justin was called up to the England under-21 team for the first time on 30 August 2019 for two 2021 UEFA European Under-21 Championship qualification matches against Turkey and Kosovo. He made his debut as an 80th-minute substitute for the injured Max Aarons in a 2–0 win over Kosovo on 9 September.

Justin received his first call up to the senior team on 24 May 2022 for the 2022–23 UEFA Nations League matches against Hungary, Germany and Italy. He made his début on 4 June against Hungary but was substituted at half time due to injury.

Style of play
Justin primarily plays as a right-back, although he has been described as being "versatile" and "attack-minded" and is able to play as a left-back, central midfielder, right midfielder and a left winger.

Career statistics

Club

International

Honours
Luton Town
EFL League One: 2018–19
EFL League Two runner-up: 2017–18

Individual
Luton Town Young Player of the Season: 2016–17, 2018–19
EFL Young Player of the Month: November 2018
EFL Team of the Season: 2018–19
PFA Team of the Year: 2018–19 League One

References

External links

Profile at the Leicester City F.C. website

1998 births
Living people
Footballers from Luton
English footballers
England youth international footballers
England under-21 international footballers
English sportspeople of Jamaican descent
Association football defenders
Luton Town F.C. players
Leicester City F.C. players
English Football League players
Premier League players
England international footballers